De La Salle School may refer to:

De La Salle School, Basildon, a school in Basildon, Essex, England
De La Salle School, St Helens, a school in St Helens, Merseyside, England
De La Salle School, a former name of Dixons Croxteth Academy,  Liverpool, Merseyside, England
De La Salle School, Singapore, a school in Singapore

See also
La Sallian educational institutions

De La Salle High School (disambiguation)